Bhaskara raya (1690–1785) is widely considered an authority on all questions pertaining to the worship of the Mother Goddess in Shakta tradition of Hinduism. He was born in a Maharashtrian Brahmin family at Hyderabad, Telangana. Bhaskara raya was welcomed by king Serfoji II of Bhonsle dynasty in South India, and thereupon he settled in Tamil Nadu. According to Douglas Renfrew Brooks, a professor of Religion specializing in Shaktism studies, Bhaskara raya was "not only a brilliant interpreter of Srividya, he was an encyclopedic writer", and that he was a "thinker who had the wealth of Tantric and Vedic traditions at his fingertips". He belonged to the Srividya tradition of the Shakta Tantrism.

Bhaskara raya is the attributed author of more than 40 and range from Vedanta to poems of devotion and from Indian logic and Sanskrit grammar to the studies of Tantra. Several of his texts are considered particularly notable to the Shaktism tradition, one focussed on the Mother Goddess:

Commentary on Tripura Upanishad and Bhavana Upanishad
Commentary on Devi Mahatmya, titled Guptavati. Bhaskara raya, in his Guptavati, offers comments on 224 out of the 579 verses of the Devi Mahatmya.
Varivasya Rahasya, is a commentary on Sri Vidya mantra and worship. The Varivasya Rahasya contains 167 ślokas numbered consecutively.  It has an accompanying commentary entitled "Prakāśa", also by Bhaskara raya.
Setubandha is a technical treatise on Tantric practice. It is his magnum opus. It is a commentary on a portion of the Vāmakeśvara-tantra dealing with the external and internal worship of Tripura Sundari. This work was completed either in 1733 AD or in 1741 AD.
"Soubhāgyabhāskara"is a commentary (bhāsya) on Lalita Sahasranama. This work was completed in 1728 AD.

His Khadyota ("Firefly") commentary on the Ganesha Sahasranama is considered authoritative by Ganapatya. 

The important events of Bhaskara raya's life is written by his disciple Jagannath Pandit or Umanandnath in Bhaskaravilas Kavyam.

References

18th-century Indian scholars
Indian Hindus
Shaktas
Bhaskara raya
Hindu tantra
Marathi people
Bhaskara raya
Bhaskara raya